33 minutes might refer to:
 33 Minutes, a 2009 film of The Heritage Foundation
 33 (Battlestar Galactica), an episode of the 2004 TV series in which Cylons attack every 33 minutes